Manu Temple is a  summit located in the Grand Canyon, in Coconino County of northern Arizona, United States. Its neighbors include Brahma Temple and Deva Temple to the east on the opposite side of Bright Angel Canyon. From the South Rim of the canyon it may be difficult to discern Manu Temple from the walls of the Kaibab Plateau one mile behind it, but when the lighting and atmosphere are favorable, this butte of great proportions can be seen clearly defined.

Manu Temple was named by George Wharton James for the Hindu lawgiver Manu, in keeping with Clarence Dutton's practice of naming features in the Grand Canyon after mythological deities. This geographical feature's name was officially adopted in 1906 by the U.S. Board on Geographic Names.

According to the Köppen climate classification system, Manu Temple is located in a Cold semi-arid climate zone. Precipitation runoff from Manu Temple drains south into the Colorado River via Bright Angel Creek on its east side, and Phantom Creek on the west side.

Geology

The summit of Manu Temple is composed of cream-colored, cliff-forming, Permian Coconino Sandstone, which is the third-youngest of the strata in the Grand Canyon, and deposited 265 million years ago as sand dunes. Below the Coconino Sandstone is slope-forming, Permian Hermit Formation, which in turn overlays the Pennsylvanian-Permian Supai Group. Further down are strata of Mississippian Redwall Limestone, Cambrian Tonto Group, and finally Proterozoic Unkar Group at creek level.

See also
 Geology of the Grand Canyon area

Gallery

References

External links 

 Weather forecast: National Weather Service
 Manu Temple video: YouTube

Grand Canyon
Landforms of Coconino County, Arizona
Buttes of Arizona
North American 2000 m summits
Colorado Plateau
Grand Canyon National Park
Grand Canyon, North Rim
Sandstone formations of the United States